The Seli’š Ksanka Qlispe’ Dam previously known as the Kerr Dam is a concrete gravity-arch dam located at river mile 72 of the Flathead River (116 river kilometer). Built in 1938, it raises the level and increases the size of Flathead Lake near Polson, Montana.  The dam was designed to generate hydroelectricity but also serves recreational and irrigation uses. 

The dam was originally named after Frank Kerr, president of the Montana Power Company, which undertook the construction, with federal assistance during the Great Depression. The construction provided numerous jobs at a critical time. The dam is located within the Flathead Indian Reservation, and the Confederated Salish and Kootenai Tribes operated it jointly with successive electric companies. In 2015 the tribes and their energy company completed purchase of the dam. On September 5, 2015, during the Confederated Salish and Kootenai Tribes' celebration of their acquisition of the dam, the Tribal Council announced renaming the complex to reflect the three confederated tribes.

Construction

The dam project was privately undertaken by Rocky Mountain Power to generate hydroelectric power in the area; it started construction in 1930. But, with revenues declining because of the Great Depression, the company halted construction in 1931. Montana State Treasurer James Brett went to a meeting in Atlanta in 1934 to ask President Franklin D. Roosevelt for $5,000,000 to complete the dam.  Knowing that the area was in desperate need of jobs, Roosevelt approved the money for the project; this was in keeping with his support of the Works Progress Administration and Civilian Conservation Corps, which provided jobs for infrastructure and public buildings across the country.

Brett returned to Montana and a hero's welcome. In 1936, the Montana Power Company restarted the project and completed it in 1938. The dam raised the existing Flathead Lake by 10 feet, and enabled control of the lake's level to generate electricity and for irrigation and recreational uses.

In March 1927 Senators Burton K Wheeler, Lynn Frazier and Robert La Follette blocked a bill that would have denied tribal ownership of the dam. "Senator Wheeler was always proud of the royalties he secured for the Flatheads."

Joint operation and change of ownership

The dam and its related hydroelectric project are located inside the boundaries of the Flathead Indian Reservation. They were operated jointly by NorthWestern Energy and the Confederated Salish and Kootenai Tribes. In the early 21st century, with an installed capacity of 208 MW, the dam provided enough power for about 147,000 homes and more than $9 million in annual revenue for the tribes. In 2015 NorthWestern Energy acquired the power plant from PPL Montana, LLC (the successor to the Montana Power Company).

On September 4, 2015, the Confederated Salish and Kootenai Tribes (CSKT) paid $18.2 million to purchase the Kerr Hydroelectric Project from NorthWestern Energy. The tribally owned Energy Keepers, Inc (EKI) took ownership.  The tribes and EKI officially celebrated acquisition of the dam on September 5, 2015 with a ceremony held at Salish Kootenai College. They renamed the dam as Séliš Ksanka Ql’ispé Dam, reflecting the confederacy of tribes.

In popular culture 
The plot of the novel Wind from an Enemy Sky by D’Arcy McNickle is centered around the construction of the Seli’š Ksanka Qlispe’ Dam.

See also 
List of dams in the Columbia River watershed

References

External links 

Dams in Montana
Buildings and structures in Lake County, Montana
NorthWestern Corporation dams
Dams completed in 1938
Dams on the Flathead River
Arch-gravity dams